The 2018–19 Idaho State Bengals men's basketball team represented Idaho State University during the 2018–19 NCAA Division I men's basketball season. The Bengals, led by seventh-year head coach Bill Evans, played their home games at Holt Arena and Reed Gym in Pocatello, Idaho as members of the Big Sky Conference. They finished the season 11–19, 7–13 in Big Sky play to finish in 11th place. They lost in the first round of the Big Sky tournament to Southern Utah.

On March 26, Idaho State decided to not renew the contract of head coach Bill Evans. He finished at Idaho State with a seven-year record of 70–141.

Previous season
The Bengals finished the 2017–18 season 14–16, 9–9 in Big Sky play to finish in a tie for sixth place. They lost in the first round of the Big Sky tournament to Southern Utah.

Offseason

Departures

Incoming transfers

2018 recruiting class

2019 recruiting class

Roster

Schedule and results

|-
!colspan=9 style=| Non-conference regular season

|-
!colspan=9 style=| Big Sky regular season

|-
!colspan=9 style=| Big Sky tournament

References

Idaho State Bengals men's basketball seasons
Idaho State
IIdaho
IIdaho